The Saltsjöbad Agreement is a Swedish labour market treaty signed between the Swedish Trade Union Confederation (LO) and the Swedish Employers Association (SAF) on 20 December 1938, that became a model for other agreements. The rules on industrial action have come to be regarded almost as general legal principles of conflicts between the labor market forces. The agreement cemented the Swedish social norm that the two sides shall conclude agreements without interference by government. The agreement is still in effect, with the latest changes being made in 1976.

In 2007, the LO, the Council for Negotiation and Co-operation (sv. Privattjänstemannakartellen, PTK) and the Confederation of Swedish Enterprise (a successor organisation to the Swedish Employers Association) began negotiations towards a new agreement at the initiative of the Confederation of Swedish Enterprise. The negotiations, however, were suspended in March 2009.

History 
Since the Swedish General Strike of 1909 the labour market had been characterised by unregulated conflict, with the SAF and LO as the main actors. A restrictive legal framework was discussed, but was met with critique both from the SAF and LO. After the Social democratic government's bill was rejected in parliament in 1935, negotiations started between the SAF and LO, which resulted in the Saltsjöbaden Agreement in 1938. Especially the chapters on industrial action were based largely on the previous proposals.

To implement the Saltsjöbaden Agreement the LO had to change their statutes. The new statutes included authorizing the secretariat to suspend conflict aid to a member union who refuses to approve the secretariat's proposals for settlement. The secretariat may also prohibit a strike if it covers more than three percent of the members of a member union, or if it is in danger of becoming so large through lockout. Member unions of the LO were also required to have a provision in their statutes empowering the board of the confederation to decide on issues of contract and industrial action, even against members expressed desire.

Reception to the treaty was mixed. LO-affiliated Swedish Transport Workers' Union (sv. Svenska Transportarbetareförbundet) commented that "in fear of death, one commits suicide" and objected especially to the fourth chapter, which governs industrial action by unions, as "repugnant".

The Saltsjöbaden Agreement launched an era of consensus and cooperation in the Swedish labour market, the so-called "saltsjöbadsandan" (Saltsjöbaden spirit), which characterized labour policy in Sweden at least until the late 1960s, when the LKAB conflict marked the start of a period of confrontation and decreasing consensus. In the early 1980s, the parties again sought consensus, which culminated in the signing of the Utvecklingsavtalet (Development Agreement) between the LO, SAF and PTK.

As Nils Elvander has called attention to, the Industriavtalet (Industry Agreement) of 1997 between trade unions and employers' associations in manufacturing industry reminds in many respects of the Saltsjöbaden Agreement and could be labeled a follow-up of our days. By that, the traditional Swedish model of industrial relations, containing a prominent role of collective agreements (regulation by the labour market parties themselves) and a climate of co-operation, was restored after a period of confrontation, particularly in the 1970s.

See also
Lilla Saltsjöbadsavtalet

References

External links
 Full text of the Saltsjöbaden Agreement  

1938 in Sweden
Economy of Sweden
Industrial agreements
Swedish Trade Union Confederation
1938 in labor relations
Society of Sweden
Politics of Sweden
December 1938 events
1938 documents